Martyana is a genus of diatoms belonging to the family Fragilariaceae.

Species:

Martyana atomus 
Martyana martyi 
Martyana schulzii

References

Fragilariophyceae
Diatom genera